Old Clump Mountain is a summit in the Catskills in the towns of Stamford and Roxbury in Delaware County, New York.

Its latitude and longitude are 42°18'39" North, 074°38'07" West. Elevation 2,926 feet.

It is the location of the registered National Historic Landmark of the birthplace, boyhood and summer homes, and burial site of American naturalist and writer John Burroughs.

Sources
 Geographic Names Information System,  USGS
 Town of Roxbury, N.Y.

References

External links

 Google Maps

Mountains of Delaware County, New York
Mountains of New York (state)